Immortalized is the sixth studio album by American heavy metal band Disturbed. The album was released on August 21, 2015 by Reprise Records, and is Disturbed's first studio album since Asylum (2010), marking the longest gap between two studio albums in their career.   

With 98,000 album-equivalent units in its first week, Immortalized is Disturbed's fifth consecutive number one debut on the United States Billboard 200 chart. They are the third band in history to achieve this feat, after Metallica and Dave Matthews Band. The band also found crossover success in the album's third single, a cover of the 1964 song "The Sound of Silence" by Simon & Garfunkel, which marked Disturbed's highest ranked single on the Billboard Hot 100 at number 42 and has since become Disturbed's biggest song since "Down with the Sickness".   

This is the band's only studio album to be recorded as a trio, as bass player John Moyer did not participate on the recording sessions due to working on other projects. Guitarist Dan Donegan performed all the bass tracks.

Production and recording
In 2011, following the tour of their fifth studio album, Asylum, Disturbed announced that they would go on a hiatus. During the hiatus, the band released a compilation album of previously recorded B-sides, The Lost Children (2011), and a box set of their five studio albums, The Collection (2012).

In January 2014, band members David Draiman (vocals), Dan Donegan (guitar), Mike Wengren (drums) met for dinner and began secretly writing material for Disturbed's sixth studio album. Bass player John Moyer was not present for the album's making, due to working with other bands and projects. The album was recorded at The Hideout Recording Studio in Las Vegas with record producer Kevin Churko. Dan Donegan told The Pulse of Radio about working with a new producer: "I think we needed… we wanted that. We wanted, especially having this time off, and being off this long break, to come back with something that sounds a little bit more fresh. It's been five years between albums, so it was nice to have, kind of, a new production element to it and things that, kind of, pushed us and challenged us to raise the bar." Draiman told Billboard regarding the songwriting process: "There's a lot of new and fresh in the mix. We had more input on each other's parts than we probably ever had previously. Everything was really put under the microscope and everybody had an opinion, and, believe me, everyone was voicing them loudly... We were very, very cooperative with one another, very professional the entire time — not that we haven't always been, but especially this time."

One of the bonus tracks "Legion of Monsters" was inspired by an incident involving Rolling Stone's August 2013 cover featuring then-accused Boston Marathon bomber Dzhokhar Tsarnaev, David Draiman was incredibly furious and verbally tore into them in a Facebook rant. "Legion of Monsters" is a scathing criticism of the media (e.g. the news) for "glorifying killers" and "inspiring others to do what they did" in the process.

Promotion and release
Immortalized was announced on June 25, 2015, alongside the release of lead single "The Vengeful One". The single released with an accompanying animated video directed by filmmaker Phil Mucci. The album's title track was released with an official lyrics video on July 24. Two additional songs, "Fire It Up" and "What Are You Waiting For" were released on July 31 and August 7, respectively. On August 14, the whole album was made available for streaming via iTunes First Play.

Due to the murders of Alison Parker and Adam Ward, Warner Bros. Records decided to pull one of the television commercials for the album as the ad depicted an incident similar to the killings.

Critical reception

Review aggregator Metacritic gave the album a score of 55 out of 100 based on 5 professional reviews, citing "mixed or average reviews". James Christopher Monger from AllMusic gave the album a three out of five stating, "A five-year break between albums should lend itself to a bit of growth, even for a band as everyman as Disturbed, but there's just not much here to keep the group's detractors from bringing out their pitchforks, and over time, staying the course may leave fewer and fewer townsfolk to protect them." Irving Tan of Sputnikmusic gave the album the same score saying, "While the album also has its fair share of bona fide, looks-like-we-just-broke-the-bottom-of-the-barrel moments ("Fire It Up" instantly comes to mind here), Disturbed manage to do just enough to keep metal purists from dispensing with them completely." Loudwires Chad Bowar said "They have always known how to write hit singles, with a string of number ones over the years. They made the record label's job nearly impossible on the new record, because out of the 13 songs on the standard edition of the album, more than half could legitimately be rock radio hit singles." Bowar concluded his review saying "It won't change the minds of those who weren't fans before, but the album will hit the spot with the band's legions of worshipers."

Jon Hadusek from Consequence of Sound was highly critical of the album giving it a D rating and saying "In this way, Immortalized is a for-fans-only release. It openly and so earnestly feeds its target audience, as if to scoff at the very idea of Art vs. Product. Lamb of God found a balance between the two with their latest album, VII: Sturm und Drang, which shines as a recent example of how to move forward artistically and still appeal to one's core fans and sell records. With Immortalized, Disturbed don't even try."

AccoladesGrammy Awards|-
| 2017 || The Sound of Silence || Best Rock Performance || Loudwire Music Awards|-
| 2015 || Immortalized || Best Rock Album || 
|-
| 2015 || rowspan="2"| "The Vengeful One" || Best Rock Song || 
|-
| 2015 || Best Rock Video || 

 Commercial performance 
The album, which earned 98,000 album-equivalent units in its first week, is Disturbed's fifth consecutive number one debut on the United States Billboard 200 chart. By November 12, 2015, Immortalized had sold over 180,000 copies in the United States. By January 25, 2017, Immortalized had sold approximately 561,000 copies in the United States. On January 25, 2018, Immortalized had been certified platinum by the RIAA in the United States, signifying sales in excess of over 1,000,000 copies.

Track listing
All music composed and performed by Disturbed, except as indicated.

Personnel
Credits adapted from AllMusic.Disturbed David Draiman – lead vocals and backing vocals
 Dan Donegan – guitars, bass, EBow, keyboards, backing vocals, acoustic guitar and piano on "The Sound of Silence"
 Mike Wengren – drums, percussion, backing vocals and timpani on "The Sound of Silence"Additional musicians Bob Sanders – voicemail speaker on "Save Our Last Goodbye"
 Kevin Churko – additional arrangement on "The Sound of Silence"
 Samantha Maloney – additional orchestral arrangement on "The Vengeful One" and "The Sound of Silence"
 Suzie Katayama – additional conductor, arrangement on "The Sound of Silence"
 Steve Churchyard – additional engineering on "The Sound of Silence"
 John Feldmann – co-writer on "What Are You Waiting For" and "Open Your Eyes"
 Nick Furlong - co-writer on "Open Your Eyes"Production and design'''
 Kevin Churko – engineer, mixing and production
 Kane Churko, Shawn McGhee – additional Pro-Tools editing
 Pete Winfield – additional mixing
 Charlie Paakari, Khloe Churko – studio management, general assistance
 Ted Jensen – engineer, layout, mastering and mixing
 Alex Tenta, Raymond Swanland – art direction, artwork, design, cover art and illustration
 Travis Shinn – photography
 Jeffrey Light – legal

Charts

Weekly charts

Year-end charts

Certifications

In popular culture
Three of the tracks in the album were released as downloadable content in the video game Rock Band 4. "Immortalized" and "The Vengeful One" were released as DLC tracks for the game on January 12, 2016, while "The Sound of Silence" was released for the DLC roster on September 27, 2016.

The AMC show Into the Badlands'' features Disturbed's version of "The Sound of Silence" in episode 13 of season 3 ("Black Lotus, White Rose").

See also
 List of number-one albums of 2015 (Australia)
 List of number-one albums of 2016 (Australia)
 List of number-one albums of 2015 (Canada)
 List of Billboard 200 number-one albums of 2015

References

External links
 

2015 albums
Disturbed (band) albums
Albums produced by Kevin Churko
Reprise Records albums